"Love Foolosophy" is the third single from British funk and acid jazz band Jamiroquai's fifth studio album, A Funk Odyssey (2001). The song was written by Jason Kay and Toby Smith. The song's title is a play on words, using a made-up portmanteau of "fool" and "philosophy" to express how he is a fool for love.

The song peaked at number 14 on the UK Singles Chart and reached the top 20 in Australia, Italy, and Spain. The song's music video features a man (Jay Kay) and his girlfriend (Heidi Klum) driving in a car and having a party in a garden of Jay Kay's mansion with other women. The garden is also featured in the video for "Seven Days in Sunny June" (2005).

Track listings

UK CD single
 "Love Foolosophy"
 "Love Foolosophy" (Knee Deep re-edit)
 "Love Foolosophy" (Twin club mix)
 "Love Foolosophy" (video)

UK DVD single
 "Love Foolosophy" (video)
 "Picture of My Life" (Radio 1 acoustic session audio)
 "Black Crow" (Radio 1 acoustic session audio)
 "Little L" (video clip)
 "You Give Me Something" (video clip)
 "Alright" (video clip)
 "Space Cowboy" (video clip)

UK 12-inch single
A1. "Love Foolosophy" (Bini & Martini Ocean remix) – 8:27
B1. "Little L" (Blaze Shelter mix) – 7:43
B2. "Love Foolosophy" (Bini's Ocean dub) – 3:46

Australian CD single
 "Love Foolosophy"
 "Love Foolosophy" (Bini & Martini Ocean remix)
 "Love Foolosophy" (Knee Deep re-edit)
 "Black Crow" (live)
 "Picture of My Life" (live)

Charts

Release history

References

Jamiroquai songs
2002 singles
2002 songs
Columbia Records singles
Songs written by Jason Kay
Songs written by Toby Smith
S2 Records singles